Haircloth is a stiff, unsupple fabric typically made from horsehair and/or from the wooly hair of a camel. Although horsehair generally refers to the hair of a horse's mane or tail, haircloth itself is sometimes called horsehair. Horse or camel hair woven into haircloth may be fashioned into clothing or upholstery.

In tailoring applications, haircloth is woven using cotton warp and horsehair weft. In traditional suit construction, haircloth is used to stiffen the front panels in men's suit jackets, and Savile Row tailors still make bespoke suits this way. However, in modern suits, haircloth is often replaced with synthetic fabrics.

In the history of brewing, for drying the malt, haircloth was spread over the kiln floor to keep grain from dropping down into the furnace. Perforated metal or tile (gratings, meshes) were also used, but had a drawback of scorching the grain.

References

Woven fabrics
Animal hair products

sv:Tagel